Chris McCausland (born ) is a British actor and comedian. He is known to television audiences for his role as Rudi in the CBeebies show Me Too! He regularly appears at comedy venues around the UK, including The Comedy Store. McCausland is blind due to retinitis pigmentosa.

Early life
McCausland was born  in West Derby Village in Liverpool but has lived in Surbiton, near Kingston upon Thames, since 1996, after moving there to study at Kingston University. He graduated in 2000, with a BSc Honours in software engineering. After a spell as a web developer, deteriorating eyesight prompted a change of direction, and he worked in sales for a number of years, during which time he first performed stand-up comedy in 2003.

Stand-up comedy
McCausland first gave stand-up a go at a new act comedy night in Balham in July 2003. Within his first year of performing, he won the Jongleurs J2O Last Laugh competition, came runner up in the Laughing Horse New Act of The Year and placed third in Channel 4's So You Think You're Funny competition.

Between 2005 and 2012, he took six stand-up shows to the Edinburgh Festival and in 2011 was awarded the Creative Diversity Award for comedy by a Channel 4-led panel of broadcasters which also included BBC, ITV and Sky. He has performed all over the world, including across Asia and the Middle East, and regularly travels the UK playing the country's top comedy clubs. He appeared on the BBC's Live at the Apollo on 4 January 2018 and more recently on the 7th January 2022 he hosted the show.

Television
In 2014, McCausland fronted a national television advert for Barclays, promoting the benefits of their new talking cash machines. Also in 2014, he starred in the Jimmy McGovern drama series Moving On, alongside Anna Crilly and Neil Fitzmaurice. In 2012, he appeared alongside fellow comedians in Jimmy Carr's Comedians Special charity episode of Celebrity Deal or No Deal.

He appeared in three series of At The Comedy Store in 2008 for Paramount Comedy, and in 2010 and 2012 for Comedy Central. In 2011 he appeared in ITV's series Stand-up Hero. In 2010, he featured in BBC One's end of year spoof news review, Unwrapped with Miranda Hart. He was also one of the principal characters in the CBeebies series Me Too!, playing Rudi the market trader. Filmed in 2006, it aired on CBeebies and internationally until April 2016. On 20 August 2018, he appeared in the long running BBC soap opera EastEnders.

On 18 October 2019, he appeared on the BBC comedy panel show Would I Lie to You. Then, on 2 December 2019, he appeared on another BBC satirical comedy panel show, Have I Got News for You with his appearance also being shown on the extended version of the episode on Have I Got A Bit More News For You.

In February 2020, he appeared on an episode of 8 Out of 10 Cats Does Countdown on Channel 4. Despite his poor eyesight, Chris scored highly throughout the episode, playing by memory alone, and even correctly guessed the difficult end of game "Countdown Conundrum" before the sighted panellists. During the show, presenter Jimmy Carr produced blindfolds for the other contestants and encouraged them to try playing without sight.

On 15 January 2021, he appeared on the Would I Lie to You one more time.

In July 2022, Channel 4 announced McCausland will present a four-part travelogue series, provisionally titled The Wonders of the World I Can't See.

Radio
He appeared on BBC Radio 4's The Museum of Curiosity in February 2023. His hypothetical donation to this imaginary museum was  "a vinyl record".

Personal life
McCausland lives with his wife Patricia and young daughter Sophie.

References

Further reading

External links
Personal website
Chortle review
Tour dates on Ents24

1977 births
Living people
20th-century English comedians
20th-century English male actors
21st-century English comedians
21st-century English male actors
Alumni of Kingston University
English blind people
Comedians from Liverpool
English male comedians
English male television actors
Male actors from Liverpool